Sunalta is a residential neighbourhood in the southwest quadrant of Calgary, Alberta.

It is located in the inner city, southwest of downtown Calgary, south of the Bow River, and both east and north of the community of Scarboro. It contains a balanced mix of single-family detached home, condominium and apartment buildings.

It is represented in the Calgary City Council by Ward 8 councilor Courtney Walcott, on a provincial level by Calgary-Currie MLA Nicholas Milliken, and at federal level by Calgary Centre MP Greg McLean.

The community was established in 1910 on land annexed to the city of Calgary in 1907 and previously owned by the Canadian Pacific Railway. The community has an area redevelopment plan in place.

Sunalta has C-Train service through the Sunalta LRT Station.

Demographics
In the City of Calgary's 2019 municipal census, Sunalta had a population of  living in  dwellings.

Sunalta is a mixed income neighbourhood, with the median household income of $32,409 (2000), and 30.1% low-income residents. As of 2000, 21.1% of the residents were immigrants. A proportion of 85.8% of the buildings were condominiums or apartments, and 83% of the housing was used for renting.

Education
The community is served by Sunalta Elementary public school and Sacred Heart Elementary school (also publicly funded.)

See also
List of neighbourhoods in Calgary

References

External links
Sunalta Community Association

Neighbourhoods in Calgary